Holy Rood Church may refer to:

United Kingdom
 Holy Rood Church, Barnsley, South Yorkshire
 Holy Rood Church, Market Rasen, Lincolnshire
 Holy Rood Church, Ossington, Nottinghamshire
 Holy Rood Church, Swindon, Wiltshire
 Holy Rood Church, Watford, Hertfordshire
 Church of the Holy Rood, Edwalton, Nottinghamshire
 Church of the Holy Rude, Stirling
 Holyrood Church, Southampton, Hampshire
 Holyrood Abbey Church, Edinburgh
 Holyrood Abbey, Edinburgh

United States
Holyrood Episcopal Church, New York City

See also
 Holyrood (disambiguation)